"One More Payment" is a song co-written and recorded by American country music artist Clint Black. It was released in April 1991 as the third single from his album Put Yourself in My Shoes. The song peaked at both number 7 on the U.S. Billboard Hot Country Singles & Tracks chart and the Canadian RPM Country Tracks chart. It was written by Black with Hayden Nicholas and Shake Russell.

Critical reception
An uncredited review in Time called it "a classic hard-times complaint about the rent, the banker at the door, and a roof that is crumbling". The Orlando Sentinel called it "a humorous workingman's lament about such everyday woes as high rent and car trouble. The arrangement is high-siprited Texas swing, but the song has a dark undertone with double-edged lines such as 'Well, I haven't bought the farm yet, but I'm not that far behind.'" The song has a western swing accompaniment.

Chart positions

Year-end charts

References

1991 singles
1990 songs
Clint Black songs
Songs written by Clint Black
Songs written by Hayden Nicholas
Song recordings produced by James Stroud
RCA Records singles